Cory Bishop is a U.S. Virgin Islands soccer player who played as a defender or midfielder. He has gained one international cap for the United States Virgin Islands national soccer team.

Early career
He attended Good Hope High School, where he was captain of his high-school soccer team, winning two consecutive St. Croix championships.

Bishop represented U.S. Virgin Islands soccer team at under-16 and under-18 level, as well representing the U.S. Virgin Islands volleyball team at under-18 and under-20 levels.

International career
Bishop made his international debut for the U.S. Virgin Islands starting against Grenada Islands in the 10–0 World Cup 2010 qualifier defeat on 26 March 2008.

References

External links
 
 

Year of birth missing (living people)
Living people
People from Saint Croix, U.S. Virgin Islands
United States Virgin Islands soccer players
Bucknell Bison men's soccer players
Association football defenders
Association football midfielders
United States Virgin Islands international soccer players